Längsee  is a lake of Carinthia, Austria. It is the name affix of the town Sankt Georgen am Längsee.

Lakes of Carinthia (state)